Jordi Fortià Martí (born 16 September 1955) is a Spanish former professional racing cyclist. He rode in the 1980 Tour de France.

Major results
1977
 3rd Road race, National Road Championships
 5th GP Pascuas
 6th Overall Tour of the Basque Country
 9th Subida a Arrate
1979
 4th Trofeo Masferrer
 7th Overall Volta a Catalunya
1980
 1st 
 3rd Overall Volta a la Comunitat Valenciana
 3rd GP Villafranca de Ordizia
1981
 9th Trofeo Masferrer

Grand Tour general classification results timeline

References

External links
 

1955 births
Living people
Spanish male cyclists
Cyclists from Catalonia
People from Gironès
Sportspeople from the Province of Girona
20th-century Spanish people